Mr. Aur Mrs. Verma Ki Rasoi is an Indian cookery show hosted by actor Sameer Iqbal Patel playing Mr. Verma.  In the show, Mr. Verma invites his chef friends to prepare a variety of food dishes and teaches them to his "wife" Seema while he assists his wife. He also adds entertainment value to the process of learning how to cook a variety of Indian foods.

External links 
 Official Site

Indian cooking television series
Sony SAB original programming